Norman Leslie James (November 29, 1840November 25, 1918) was an American farmer, merchant, and Republican politician.  He was a member of the Wisconsin State Senate (1885, 1887) and State Assembly (1873, 1875), representing Richland County.  His brother David G. James also served in the Wisconsin Senate, representing the same district.

Early life and war service
James was born November 29, 1840, in Deerfield, New Hampshire.  He came to Wisconsin with his parents and siblings in 1855, settling in Richland Center.  He received a common school education in New Hampshire and continued his education at the public school in Richland Center.  At age 18, he began working at various occupations, taught common school, and hired private instructors for his own advancement.

At the outbreak of the American Civil War, he volunteered for service in the Union Army, along with his younger brother, David G. James, and several of their former school classmates.  They were enrolled as privates in Company F of the 16th Wisconsin Infantry Regiment.  The 16th Wisconsin Infantry mustered into federal service in January 1862 and headed for St. Louis, Missouri, in March, for service in the western theater of the war.  They arrived at Pittsburg Landing, Tennessee, on March 20, 1862, and were assigned to the left wing of Grant's army.  On April 6, 1862, they were involved in the first skirmishing of the Battle of Shiloh.  During the battle, their brigade fell back several times.  The 16th Wisconsin held up well even when nearly surrounded by the enemy, and ultimately suffered 40 dead and 188 wounded.

James was not personally wounded at Shiloh, but was seriously ill after the fighting and was sent to a hospital north of Cairo, Illinois.  He was ultimately discharged due to disability in October 1862.  He attempted to re-enlist several times, but was not accepted back into the service.

Business career
In February 1863, he formed a partnership with his father in a hardware business under the firm name "G. H. and N. L. James".  After his brother, David, returned from the war, he joined the partnership, and the firm name was soon changed to "James Brothers".  They operated the business together until 1880, when Norman sold his share of the company to David.  In the late 1860s, the James brothers also partnered in a mail-carrying service that evolved into a general freight and passenger service, but this gave way to interest in the railroad business in the 1870s.  James became invested in the Pine River and Stevens Point Railroad Company, which was completed in 1876, after which James operated as general manager for two years.  The railroad was sold to the St. Paul Railroad Company in 1880.

After selling his stake in the hardware business and the railroad, James opened a lumber yard and operated a mill for the next fourteen years.  In that business, he contracted to provide bridge timber for the St. Paul Railroad Company.  In the 1890s, James returned to the railroad industry, working as general manager of the Kickapoo Valley Railroad, brought it to profitability, and then again sold out to the St. Paul Railroad in 1903.

James also engaged for some years in the furniture manufacturing business.  The factory fell into his possession after he had put up security for a firm that had failed.

In addition to his business interests, James was also active in agriculture.  He brought the first creamery to Richland County in 1878 and implemented the first centrifugal separator in the state.

Public offices

James served as a member of the town and village board, and village treasurer. He was first elected to the Assembly for Richland County's first Assembly district (the Towns of (Towns of Buena Vista, Henrietta, Ithaca, Orion, Richland, Rockbridge, Westford and Willow) in 1872 as a Republican; he did not seek re-election, and was succeeded by fellow Republican Joseph McGrew. He was elected again in 1874, with 776 votes to 659 for Democrat V. G. Harter. He was not a candidate for re-election in 1875, and was succeeded by Democrat J. L. R. McCollum.

James served as a delegate to the 1880 Republican National Convention. He was elected state senator for the 28th District (at that time consisting of Iowa and Richland Counties) in 1884 (Republican incumbent William C. Meffert was not a candidate), receiving 4,712 votes, against 4,291 for Democrat George Crawford  and 573 for Prohibitionist John Lee. He served as chairman of the standing committee on railroads. He was not a candidate for re-election in 1888, and was succeeded by another Republican, Robert Joiner

Congressional testimony

In 1911, he testified before the United States Senate about his involvement in the election of Isaac Stephenson to the Senate from Wisconsin. He described himself as a longtime friend and supporter of Stephenson, whom he had met when they were both delegates to the 1880 Republican National Convention, and with whom he often went fishing. He testified that the only money he had been paid from the campaign was reimbursement for expenditures he'd made in support of Stephenson's election. He testified that while he was not (as had been inquired) "a man of some means," nonetheless "... I have always taken an active part in politics. That is, I have always had some man as a candidate that I was interest in."

Personal life 
Norman James was the eldest of four children born to George Hopkins James and his wife Lois Eames ( Heard).  Norman's younger brother, David Goodrich James, served in the Wisconsin Senate in the 1900s, also representing the 28th Senate district.  Norman's niece—David's daughter—Ada James became a noted suffragist.

Norman James married Georgia Lane of Bear Valley, Wisconsin, on September 11, 1865.  They had four children together.  Their son Harry became a career U.S. Army officer and served in the Spanish–American War.  Their son Norman Jr. took over the family lumber business in Wisconsin.

He died at his home in Richland Center on November 25, 1918.

Electoral history

Wisconsin Assembly (1872)

| colspan="6" style="text-align:center;background-color: #e9e9e9;"| General Election, November 5, 1872

Wisconsin Assembly (1874)

| colspan="6" style="text-align:center;background-color: #e9e9e9;"| General Election, November 3, 1874

Wisconsin Senate (1884)

| colspan="6" style="text-align:center;background-color: #e9e9e9;"| General Election, November 4, 1884

References

People from Deerfield, New Hampshire
People from Richland Center, Wisconsin
People of Wisconsin in the American Civil War
Businesspeople from Wisconsin
Republican Party Wisconsin state senators
Republican Party members of the Wisconsin State Assembly
1840 births
1918 deaths
Timber industry
People in retailing
Farmers from Wisconsin
American merchants
Wisconsin city council members
19th-century American politicians